Ek Nanad Ki Khushiyon Ki Chaabi... Meri Bhabhi (English: The key to a girl's happiness... My sister-in-law) or simply Meri Bhabhi (My Brother's Wife) (International Title: Brave and Beautiful) is an Indian television soap opera which aired on Star Plus. The show premiered on 17 June 2013.

The show outlines the bond of love between the nanad (the sister of one's husband) and bhabhi (the wife of one's brother) of the Shergill family. The show went off air on 12 April 2014, replaced by Ek Hasina Thi.

Shemaroo Entertainment has Owned the TV Rights and aired The Show on Shemaroo Umang from 5 April 2022.

Plot summary
Shraddha, the only daughter of Delhi-based colonel Zorwar Shergil, marries her boyfriend, Bobby against her family's wishes and starts living with him in Mumbai. They have a son, named Dhruv and Shraddha keeps in touch with her brother, Anand's wife Kritika "Kittu".

Sometime later, suspecting Shraddha of being in trouble, Kittu convinces Anand to pay her a surprise visit in Mumbai where Anand discovers that Bobby has left Shraddha and Dhruv to fend for themselves and Shraddha is struggling to make ends meet. He brings her back home with him, after several hurdles, Shraddha procures a divorce from Bobby with help from Anand's lawyer friend, Jas and Kittu's brother, Kunal. Kunal and Shraddha fall in love but his mother Kamini tries to keep them apart not wanting a divorced single mother for a daughter-in-law. Wanting to do everything she can for her nanad's happiness, Kittu helps Kunal and Shraddha elope but their families arrive in the nick of time. Zorawar forces Shraddha to choose between him and Kunal, and she leaves a heartbroken Kunal for her family.

This worsens the relationship between Kittu and Anand who blames Kittu for the situation, Kittu decides to move to her parents' home till she wins back Anand's respect and trust, feeling sorry for Kittu, Kunal and Shraddha team up to patch things for her with Anand and tell Anand that Kittu is pregnant, Anand starts taking care of Kittu and brings her home, after some confusion, Anand realises Kittu is not pregnant and accuses her of not deserving his trust, unaware that she had no role in the plan, by the time Jas explains the situation to him, Kittu has gone missing, he finds her about to commit suicide and apologises. They reconcile and reunite.

Meanwhile, Zorawar softens his stand and Kunal and Shraddha are finally married much to Kamini's disappointment, after several hurdles, she finally accepts Shraddha. The show ends on a happy note as Kittu announces her pregnancy. And the show ends .

Cast

Main cast
Esha Kansara as Kritika "Kittu" Srivastav Shregill – Purushottam and Kamini's daughter; Kunal's sister; Anand's wife; Shraddha's sister-in-law 
Kanchi Kaul as Shraddha Shregill Srivastav – Zorawar and Amrit's daughter; Anand, Ishaan and Ashish's sister; Kritika's sister-in-law; Bobby's ex-wife; Kunal's wife; Dhruv's mother
Ravish Desai as Kunal Srivastav – Purushottam and Kamini's son; Kritika's brother; Shraddha's husband
Vipul Gupta as Anand Shergil – Zorawar and Amrit's son; Shraddha, Ishaan and Ashish's brother; Kritika's husband

Recurring cast
Kanwaljit Singh as Colonel Zorawar Shergill – Amrit's husband; Anand, Shraddha, Ishaan and Ashish's father
Supriya Pilgaonkar as Amrit Zorawar Shergill – Zorawar's wife; Anand, Shraddha, Ishaan and Ashish's mother
Abhishek Bajaj as Ishaan Shergill – Zorawar and Amrit's son; Anand, Shraddha and Ashish's brother
Karaan Singh as Ashish Shergill – Zorawar and Amrit's son; Anand, Shraddha and Ishaan's brother; Jaya's husband
Priyanka Singh as Jaya Shergill – Ashish's wife
Madhura Naik as Jaspreet aka Jas – Anand's lawyer and friend
Rohit Sagar as Purushottam Srivastav – Kamini's husband; Kriitka and Kunal's father
Shweta Gautam as Kamini Srivastav – Purushottam's wife; Kritika and Kunal's mother
Krutika Gaikwad as Ritika
Bharat Chawda as Bobby Sood – Shraddha's ex-husband; Dhruv's father
Uzair Basar as Dhruv Shregill – Shraddha and Bobby's son
Mansi Sharma as Chhaya

Guest stars 
Surbhi Chandna as Suzanne

Production
The series which was in works since 2012, produced by Deeya Singh and Tony Singh under DJ's a Creative Unit, was initially titled as Sher Dil Shergil and the promo of the series started to air on StarPlus which was supposed to premiere during early 2013. The cast of the series included  were Supriya Pilgaonkar, Kanwaljeet Singh, Kanchi Kaul, Chhavi Mittal, Diwakar Pundir, Ulka Gupta, Parakh Madhan, Sunayana Fozdar and Uzair Basar.

However, the channel being unhappy with the episodes shot, scrapped them and instructed the production house to rework on the show and script in January 2013. The series undergone a revamp with the former script consisting of many children being reduced and change of story focus to adult cast with some cast changes with Kanchi Kaul, Supriya Pilgaonkar, Kanwaljeet Singh and Uzair Basar being retained while others being dropped out. Abhishek Bajaj, Esha Kansara, Vipul Gupta, Shweta Gautam and Rohit Sagar were some of the new additions then.  The series was also renamed as Ek Nanad Ki Khushiyon Ki Chaabi... Meri Bhabhi before its premiere and was launched during early June 2013.

The series garnered an average ratings in its prime time slot and in March 2014 it was decided to end the series due to its low ratings and it went off air on 12 April 2014. The shooting of the series was wrapped up on 11 April 2014.

Reception
The series opened with a low rating of 1.9 TVR in its debut week.

References

External links
 Official website
 

2013 Indian television series debuts
2014 Indian television series endings
Indian television soap operas
StarPlus original programming